The United Nations Peacekeeping efforts began in 1948. Its first activity was in the Middle East to observe and maintain the ceasefire  during the 1948 Arab–Israeli War. Since then, United Nations peacekeepers have taken part in a total of 72 missions around the globe, 14 of which continue today. The peacekeeping force as a whole received the Nobel Peace Prize in 1988.

Though the term "peacekeeping" is not found in the United Nations Charter, the authorization is generally considered to lie in (or between) Chapter 6 and Chapter 7. Chapter 6 describes the Security Council's power to investigate and mediate disputes, while Chapter 7 discusses the power to authorize economic, diplomatic, and military sanctions, as well as the use of military force, to resolve disputes. The founders of the UN envisioned that the organization would act to prevent conflicts between nations and make future wars impossible; however, the outbreak of the Cold War made peacekeeping agreements extremely difficult due to the division of the world into hostile camps. Following the end of the Cold War, there were renewed calls for the UN to become the agency for achieving world peace, and the agency's peacekeeping dramatically increased, authorizing more missions between 1991 and 1994 than in the previous 45 years combined.

Early years

The League of Nations-controlled International Force in the Saar (1934–35) may be "the first true example of an international peace observation force".

Before any official peacekeeping mission, the UN played an important role in the conflict concerning Trieste after World War II. From 1947 to 1954, Trieste was declared an independent city state under the protection of the United Nations as the Free Territory of Trieste. The territory was divided into two zones, which later formed the basis for the division of the territory between Italy and Yugoslavia. The UN also authorized two nations to station troops in the Free Territory, the US (Trieste United States Troops) and the UK (British Element Trieste Force) in the northern zone and Yugoslavia in the southern zone.

The first UN peacekeeping mission was a team of observers deployed to the Middle East in 1948, during the 1948 Arab–Israeli War. The mission was officially authorized on May 29, 1948. This date is used as a memorial day to all the UN peacekeepers who have died known as the International Day of United Nations Peacekeepers. The group, the UN Truce Supervision Organization (UNTSO), as it was named, continues to monitor the situation and has provided observers for a number of conflicts in the region since then. In 1949, observers were deployed to the border of India and Pakistan in a similar mission after the Indo-Pakistani War of 1947 (UNMOGIP). They also continue to monitor the border. In 1950, the UN faced one of its greatest early challenges when North Korea invaded South Korea, starting the Korean War. The Soviet Union was, at the time, boycotting the UN in protest over the Chinese seat being occupied by the Republic of China rather than the People's Republic of China. It was therefore unable to veto the authorization of member states to assist in the defense of South Korea. The United Nations forces pushed the North Koreans out of the South and made it to the Chinese border before the Chinese People's Volunteer Army intervened and pushed the UN back to the 38th parallel. Although a cease-fire was declared in 1953, UN forces remained along the demilitarized zone until 1967, when American and South Korean forces took over.

In 1956, the UN responded to the Suez Crisis with the United Nations Emergency Force to supervise the withdrawal of invading forces. United Nations Emergency Force as a peacekeeping force was initially suggested as a concept by Canadian diplomat and future Canadian Prime Minister Lester Pearson as a means of resolving conflicts between states. He suggested deploying unarmed or lightly armed military personnel from a number of countries, under UN command, to areas where warring parties were in need of a neutral party to observe the peace process. Pearson was awarded the Nobel Peace Prize in 1957 for his work in establishing UN peacekeeping operations. UNEF was the first official armed peacekeeping operation modeled on Pearson's ideas. Since 1956, most UN peacekeeping forces, including those called "observer" missions, have been armed.

Cold War

Throughout the Cold War, the tensions on the UN Security Council made it difficult to implement peacekeeping measures in countries and regions seen to relate to the spread or containment of leftist and revolutionary movements. While some conflicts were separate enough from the Cold War to achieve consensus support for peacekeeping missions, most were too deeply enmeshed in the global struggle.

International conflicts
The UN Peacekeeping Force in Cyprus, begun in 1964, attempted to end the conflict between the ethnic Greeks and Turks on the island and prevent wider conflict between NATO members Turkey and Greece. A second observer force, UNIPOM, was also dispatched, in 1965 to the areas of the India-Pakistan border that were not being monitored by the earlier mission, UNMOGIP, after a ceasefire in the Indo-Pakistani War of 1965. Neither of these disputes were seen to have Cold War or ideological implications.

There was one exception to the rule. In the Mission of the Representative of the Secretary-General in the Dominican Republic (DOMREP), 1965–1966, the UN authorized an observer mission in a country where ideological factions were facing off. However, the mission was only initiated after the US intervened unilaterally in a civil war between leftist and conservative factions. The US had consolidated its hold and invited a force of the Organization of American States (dominated by US troops) to keep the peace. The mission was approved mainly because the Americans presented it as fait accompli and because the UN mission was not a full peacekeeping force. It included only two observers at any time and left the peacekeeping to another international organization. It was the first time the UN operated in this manner with a regional bloc.

Decolonization
The UN also assisted with two decolonization programs during the Cold War. In 1960, the UN sent ONUC to help facilitate the decolonization of the Congo from Belgian control. It stayed on until 1964 to help maintain stability and prevent the breakup of the country during the Congo Crisis. In West New Guinea from 1962 to 1963, UNSF maintained law and order while the territory was transferred from Dutch colonial control to Indonesia.

Middle East conflicts
The Middle East, where combatants were generally not firmly aligned with the superpowers, who mainly sought stability in the crucial oil-producing region, was the most visible location of UN peacekeeping during the Cold War. In 1958, UNOGIL was authorized to ensure that there was no illegal infiltration of personnel or supply of arms across the Lebanese borders, mainly from the United Arab Republic. A few years later, the Yemen Observer Mission (UNYOM), authorized in 1963, attempted to end civil war in Yemen with sides supported by regional rivals Egypt and Saudi Arabia. Throughout the 1970s, the UN also authorized several peacekeeping missions to attempt to calm the Arab–Israeli conflict, in Suez (UNEF II) in 1973 and in the Golan Heights (UNDOF) in 1974 concluding the Yom Kippur War, and Lebanon (UNIFIL) in 1978 following the 1978 South Lebanon conflict. In the 1980s only one new mission was authorized in the region, UNIIMOG, to supervise the withdrawal of troops to the internationally recognized border between Iraq and Iran after almost eight years of war between those two countries.

End of the Cold War

With the decline of the Soviet Union and the advent of perestroika, the Soviet Union drastically decreased its military and economic support for a number of "proxy" civil wars around the globe. It also withdrew its support from satellite states and one UN peacekeeping mission, UNGOMAP, was designed to oversee the Pakistan–Afghanistan border and the withdrawal of Soviet troops from Afghanistan as the USSR began to refocus domestically. In 1991, the USSR dissolved into 15 independent states. Conflicts broke out in two former Soviet Republics, the Georgian–Abkhazian conflict in Georgia and a civil war in Tajikistan, which were eventually policed by UN peacekeeping forces, UNOMIG and UNMOT respectively.

With the end of the Cold War, a number of nations called for the UN to become an organization of world peace and do more to encourage the end to conflicts around the globe. The end of political gridlock in the Security Council helped the number of peacekeeping missions increased substantially. In a new spirit of cooperation, the Security Council established larger and more complex UN peacekeeping missions. Furthermore, peacekeeping came to involve more and more non-military elements that ensured the proper operation of civic functions, such as elections. The UN Department of Peacekeeping Operations was created in 1992 to support the increased demand for such missions.

A number of missions were designed to end civil wars in which competing sides had been sponsored by Cold War players. In Angola (UNAVEM I, II and III) aimed to end fighting between rebel, anti-Communist UNITA and the ruling, Communist MPLA. ONUMOZ was similarly designed to oversee the end of the conflict between the anti-Communist RENAMO and the leftist government in Mozambique, ending the Mozambican Civil War. In Cambodia UNAMIC, and then UNTAC for the first time took over control of the entire state on behalf of the UN and organized and ran an election before turning control over to the elected government. In Central America, ONUCA oversaw the restriction of cross-border aid by any one country to insurgencies in any other. Five nations were involved: El Salvador, Guatemala, Costa Rica, Nicaragua, and Honduras. The guerrilla movements in all five countries, variously communist and anti-communist, gave way to UN-brokered peace agreements in the 1990s. In El Salvador, a further internal UN peacekeeping force, (ONUSAL), was authorized to verify the ceasefire between the socialist FMLN and the government. Similarly, in Guatemala, MINUGUA was authorized in 1996 to verify the ceasefire there between leftist URNG and the conservative government.

Post Cold War

International conflicts

In 1991, the political situation created by the collapse of the USSR allowed the first explicitly-authorized operation of collective self-defense since the Korean War: expelling Iraq from Kuwait in the Gulf War. Following the cessation of hostilities, the UN authorized United Nations Iraq–Kuwait Observation Mission (UNIKOM) to monitor the DMZ between the two countries. Two other inter-state conflicts have been the cause for UN peacekeeping since. In 1994, the United Nations Aouzou Strip Observer Group (UNASOG) oversaw the withdrawal of Libya from a strip of contested territory in accordance with the decision of the International Court of Justice. In 2000, UN Mission in Ethiopia and Eritrea (UNMEE) was established to monitor the cessation of hostilities after the Eritrean–Ethiopian War.

Civil Wars
The 1990s also saw the UN refocus its attention on genocide and ethnic cleansing. The Civil War in Rwanda and the breakup of Yugoslavia both were occasions of widespread atrocities and ethnic violence. Eight UN peacekeeping missions have been sent to the former Yugoslavia, UNPROFOR, UNCRO, UNPREDEP, UNMIBH, UNTAES, UNMOP, UNPSG, and UNMIK as well as two to Rwanda, UNAMIR and UNOMUR.

Despite the cessation of international, Cold-War inspired aid, civil wars continued in many regions and the UN attempted to bring peace. Several conflicts were the cause of multiple peace-keeping missions.

The collapse of Somalia into the Somali Civil War in 1991 saw UNOSOM I, UNITAF, and UNOSOM II fail to bring peace and stability, though they did mitigate the effects of the famine.

The First Liberian Civil War resulted in the authorization of UNOMIL in September 1993 to assist and supervise the troops of the Economic Community of West African States (ECOWAS), which had intervened militarily at the request of the Liberian government, and oversee the maintenance of the peace agreement in the nation. However, two rebel groups instigated the Second Liberian Civil War in 2003, and UNMIL was dispatched to oversee the implementation of the ceasefire agreement and continues to assist in national security reform.

A coup in Haiti in 1991, followed by internal violence, was the impetus for the UN Mission in Haiti (UNMIH). In 1996 and 1997 three missions, UNSMIH, UNTMIH, and MIPONUH, were organized with the goal of reforming, training, and assisting the police through a period of political turmoil. A coup d'état in 2004 saw the ouster of the president and the UN authorized MINUSTAH to stabilize the country.

In Sudan, the UN initially sponsored UNMIS to enforce a ceasefire between the Sudan People's Liberation Army/Movement and the Sudanese government. Since then, rebel groups in Darfur have clashed with government-sponsored forces, resulting in UNAMID, the AU/UN Hybrid Operation in Darfur. Violence in Darfur, spilled over the border into Chad and the Central African Republic. In 2007, MINURCAT was deployed to minimize violence to civilians and prevent interference of aid distribution related to violence in Darfur.

The UN has also organized single peacekeeping missions aimed at ending civil wars in a number of countries. In Central African Republic, MINURCA (1998) was created to oversee the disarmament of several mutinous groups of former CAR military personnel and militias as well as to assist with the training of a new national police and the running of elections. The mission was extended after successful elections to help ensure further stability. In Sierra Leone, UNOMSIL/UNAMSIL in 1999, followed the ECOMOG-led restoration of the government after a coup. In 1999, in the Democratic Republic of the Congo MONUC was designed to monitor the ceasefire after the Second Congo War—it continues to operate due to continuing violence in parts of the DRC. In Cote d'Ivoire, UNOCI was dispatched to enforce a 2004 peace agreement ending the Ivorian Civil War, though the country remains divided. Following ceasefire agreements ending the Burundi Civil War, ONUB was authorized in 2004 to oversee the implementation of the Arusha Peace Accords.

Independence facilitation efforts
UN Peacekeepers have also been used to oversee independence movements and the establishment of new states. Beginning in 1989, UNTAG in Namibia oversaw the withdrawal of South Africa and the election of a new government. In 1991, a ceasefire and referendum were planned by Morocco regarding the region of Western Sahara. Disagreements prevented the referendum, but the ceasefire continues to be monitored by MINURSO. In East Timor, in 1999, a referendum voted for independence from Indonesia. Violence by anti-independence forces followed and UNTAET was set up to establish control and administer the territory until independence, after which an assistance mission was established, UNMISET.  Violence during 2006 led to the establishment of UNMIT, which continues to monitor the situation.

Assessment

A 2005 RAND Corporation study found the UN to be successful in two out of three peacekeeping efforts. It compared UN nation-building efforts to those of the United States, and found that seven out of eight UN cases are at peace, as opposed to four out of eight US cases at peace. Also in 2005, the Human Security Report documented a decline in the number of wars, genocides and human rights abuses since the end of the Cold War, and presented evidence, albeit circumstantial, that international activism—mostly spearheaded by the UN—has been the main cause of the decline in armed conflict since the end of the Cold War.

The UN has also drawn criticism for perceived failures. In some cases, the Security Council has failed to pass resolutions or the member states have been reluctant to fully enforce them in the face of deteriorating conditions.  Disagreements in the Security Council are seen as having failed to prevent the 1994 Rwandan genocide.  UN and international inaction has also been cited for failing to intervene and provide sufficient humanitarian aid during the Second Congo War, the failure of UN peacekeepers to prevent the 1995 Srebrenica massacre, failure to provide effective humanitarian aid in Somalia, failing to implement provisions of Security Council resolutions related to the Israeli–Palestinian conflict, Kashmir dispute and continuing failure to prevent genocide or provide assistance in Darfur.

One suggestion to address the problem of delays such as the one in Rwanda, is a rapid reaction force: a standing group, administered by the UN and deployed by the Security Council that receives its troops and support from current Security Council members and is ready for quick deployment in the event of future genocides.

UN peacekeepers have also been accused of sexual abuse including child rape, gang rape, and soliciting prostitutes during peacekeeping missions in the Congo, Haiti, Liberia, Sudan, Burundi, and Côte d'Ivoire.

In response to criticism, including reports of sexual abuse by peacekeepers, the UN has taken steps toward reforming its operations. The Brahimi Report was the first of many steps to recap former peacekeeping missions, isolate flaws, and take steps to patch these mistakes to ensure the efficiency of future peacekeeping missions. The UN has vowed to continue to put these practices into effect when performing peacekeeping operations in the future. The technocratic aspects of the reform process have been continued and revitalised by the DPKO in its 'Peace Operations 2010' reform agenda. The 2008 capstone doctrine entitled "United Nations Peacekeeping Operations: Principles and Guidelines" incorporates and builds on the Brahimi analysis.

In 2013, the NGO Transparency International released a report critical of UN Peacekeeping anti-corruption guidance and oversight.

See also

 List of United Nations peacekeeping missions
 History of the United Nations
 Timeline of United Nations peacekeeping missions
 International Day of United Nations Peacekeepers
 Attacks on humanitarian workers

References

Further reading

External links
 UN peacekeeping home includes history, news, and links to other related UN sites. (English, Arabic, Chinese, French, Russian, Spanish)
 UN peacekeeping proposal: The presentation of the Eurocorps-Foreign Legion concept and its Single European Regiment at the European Parliament in June 2003
 A historical perspective of UN peace-keeping

History of the United Nations
United Nations peacekeeping